Badal is a 2000 Indian Hindi-language action drama  film directed by Raj Kanwar. The film stars Bobby Deol and Rani Mukerji in lead roles with Amrish Puri. The movie is inspired by The Devil's Own (1997), starring Harrison Ford and Brad Pitt. It was a commercial success.

Plot
Badal is a young man with a tragic childhood. As a child, he had witnessed his entire family, his loving father, mother, and baby sister, murdered in a village massacre by ruthless and corrupt police officer Jaisingh Rana, who kills people for fun. He is then brought up by his late father's friend Jeetram, who himself is on the run from Rana. Years later, Badal has become a dreaded terrorist work for Jeetram under the name Rajveer whose main target in life is exacting revenge on Jaisingh Rana for his family's horrible death. In this endeavor, Badal travels to a small town, where he meets a good-natured police officer, ACP Ranjeet Singh, who takes Badal under his wing, and Rani, a bubbly free spirited girl who falls madly in love with him. Ranjeet Singh and his wife Simran start considering Badal as their son and his daughters start to look up to Badal as an elder brother. Through both Singh's family and Rani, Badal is given a new lease of life and comes to understand the values of sentiments, love, and relationships, all of which he has missed out on in his life.

Meanwhile, Rana has now been promoted to DIG but still hasn't changed his old evil ways. He has Jeetram captured and tortures him to know the location of his accomplices. Badal frees Jeetram and is pursued by the police force led by Ranjeet Singh. However, Jeetram commits suicide to protect Badal's identity from getting revealed much to the latter's shock and grief.

Cast

 Bobby Deol as Raja / Badal
 Rani Mukherji as Rani
 Mayuri Kango as Soni
 Ashutosh Rana as DIG Jai Singh Rana
 Amrish Puri as ACP Ranjeet Singh
 Ashish Vidyarthi as Jeet Ram
 Johnny Lever as Guler Mehndi
 Upasna Singh as Guler Mehndi's wife
 Neena Kulkarni as Simran Singh
 Sana Saeed as Preeti
 Alok Nath as Badal's father
 Kulbhushan Kharbanda as Rani's Grandfather
 Akash Khurana as minister Satyaprakash Shinde
 Harish Patel as Daya Shankar
 Mushtaq Khan as Police Constable Mangiram
 Vishwajeet Pradhan as Sahab Singh
 Shahbaz Khan (actor) as terrorist Asgar
 Jeetu Verma as terrorist Rafiq, and Asgar's younger brother
 Dina Pathak
 Salim Ghouse
 Suman Ranganathan as item number
 Mink Brar as item number
 Pappu Polyester
 Dinesh Anand
 Mandira Bedi

Soundtrack 

The music for Badal was composed and produced by Anu Malik while the lyrics where penned by Sameer. The film has six original songs, a medley, and one instrumental song, featuring some popular songs like "Yaar Mere Yaaram" and others. The soundtrack for the film has received a rating of 5/10 from Mohammad Ali Ikram of Planet Bollywood, with the author saying, "The tunes of Badal might not be that bad, but one expects far better from the man who gave us timeless tunes in Border, Kareeb, Baazigar and Main Khiladi Tu Anari."

Track list

References

External links 

Rediff review
Planet Bollywood review

2000 films
2000s Hindi-language films
Films set in 1984
Films scored by Anu Malik
Insurgency in Punjab in fiction
Fictional portrayals of police departments in India
2000 action drama films
Films about terrorism in India
Films directed by Raj Kanwar
Indian crime drama films
Indian action drama films
2000 crime drama films